The 1991 NCAA Division III football season, part of the college football season organized by the NCAA at the Division III level in the United States, began in August 1991, and concluded with the NCAA Division III Football Championship, also known as the Stagg Bowl, in December 1991 at Hawkins Stadium in Bradenton, Florida. The Ithaca Bombers won their third Division III championship by defeating the Dayton Flyers, 34−20.

Conference changes and new programs

Conference standings

Conference champions

Postseason
The 1991 NCAA Division III Football Championship playoffs were the 19th annual single-elimination tournament to determine the national champion of men's NCAA Division III college football. The championship Stagg Bowl game was held at Hawkins Stadium in Bradenton, Florida for the second time. Like the previous six tournaments, this year's bracket featured sixteen teams.

Playoff bracket

See also
1991 NCAA Division I-A football season
1991 NCAA Division I-AA football season
1991 NCAA Division II football season

References